A valley girl is an affluent girl living in the San Fernando Valley.

Valley Girl may also refer to:
Valley Girl (1983 film), a film starring Nicolas Cage
Valley Girl (2020 film), a remake of the 1983 film
"Valley Girls", a 2009 Gossip Girl episode
The Valley Girl Show, a talk show hosted by Jesse Draper
Valley Girl, a character in The Catherine Tate Show
"Valley Girl" (song), a song by Frank Zappa